Crystal River may refer to the following places in the United States of America:

Crystal River, Florida, a small city in Florida
Crystal River (Florida), a river near the small city of the same name
Crystal River (Colorado), a tributary of the Roaring Fork River in Colorado
Crystal River (Michigan), a stream located in northern Michigan's Lower Peninsula
Crystal River Archaeological State Park in Florida
Crystal River Energy Complex in Florida
Crystal River Nuclear Plant in Florida, a part of the Crystal River Energy Complex
Crystal River, a river and tributary of the Tomorrow/Waupaca River, in Central Wisconsin